The Detroit Auto Club was a minor league professional ice hockey team, and one of the four founding members of the International Hockey League in 1945, and operated until 1951. They played their home games at Olympia Stadium  in Detroit, Michigan. The Detroit Auto Club won the inaugural Turner Cup, as playoff champions.

Standings

External links
 standings and statistics

International Hockey League (1945–2001) teams
A
Professional ice hockey teams in Michigan
Defunct ice hockey teams in the United States
Ice hockey clubs established in 1945
Sports clubs disestablished in 1951